Vincent Kayizzi (born 6 March 1984) is a Ugandan international football midfielder playing for OC Bokavu Dawa.

Club career
Kayizzi started playing in Ugandan Super League club Kampala City Council FC. In the season 2006/07 he had a spell in the leading Rwandan football club APR FC. In January 2009 he moved to Europe to play in Serbian First League (Serbian second tier) club FK Srem, a club that is pioneer in Europe in bringing other Ugandan players, like Nestroy Kizito and Phillip Ssozi. He later had another stint in Europe, when he played with Motor Lublin in the 2012–13 Polish Second League.

International career
Kayizzi plays in the Uganda national football team since 2004, and till 2014, has 40 caps and 4 goals scored.

Honours
 Kampala City Council
Ugandan Super League: 2008, 2016–17
Ugandan Cup: 2004, 2017

 APR FC
Rwandan Premier League: 2007
Rwandan Cup: 2007

 Uganda Revenue Authority
Ugandan Super League: 2011

 Vipers
Ugandan Super League: 2014–15

References

Living people
1984 births
Sportspeople from Kampala
Ugandan footballers
Uganda international footballers
Kampala Capital City Authority FC players
Uganda Revenue Authority SC players
APR F.C. players
Expatriate footballers in Rwanda
FK Srem players
FK Novi Pazar players
Serbian First League players
Expatriate footballers in Serbia
Association football midfielders
Ugandan expatriate sportspeople in Rwanda
Ugandan expatriate sportspeople in Serbia
Ugandan expatriate sportspeople in Poland
Ugandan expatriate sportspeople in the Democratic Republic of the Congo
Expatriate footballers in the Democratic Republic of the Congo
Uganda A' international footballers
2014 African Nations Championship players